The Weightlifting Federation of Africa was founded in 1978. The federation is the body that governs and oversees weightlifting sports in Africa.

Events
 African Weightlifting Championships From 1979
 African Junior Weightlifting Championships From 1986 or 1995
 African Youth Weightlifting Championships From 2009

References

External links
 

Sports governing bodies in Nigeria
International sports organizations
Weightlifting
Sports organizations established in 1978